Stardom is a second studio album by Vũ Cát Tường, released on October 18, 2018 after 3 years since her debut album Giải mã. The album remarked a whole new chapter after 5 years of Vũ Cát Tường as a professional singer-songwriter and record producer. The album reflects various slices of the artist's personality that Vũ Cát Tường has accumulated in the music and life. "Leader" was released as a single in October 2018.

The album was written in pop, neo soul, R&B, electropop, EDM, hip hop and ballad. This is the first album of Vietnamese artist distributed by Universal Music Group globally. Universal Music Group and Tường accompanied in the promotion campaign in Singapore, performing in the famous Fashion Show Council of Asean Fashion Designer in Malaysia.

Track listing

Accolades

References 

Vũ Cát Tường albums
2018 albums
Electropop albums